Abu al-Fath Mahmud ibn Muhammad ibn Qasim ibn Fadl al-Isfahani , Latinized  𝐀𝐛𝐚𝐥𝐩𝐡𝐚𝐭𝐮𝐬, 𝐀𝐬𝐩𝐡𝐚𝐡𝐚𝐧𝐞𝐧𝐬𝐢𝐬, was a 10th-century Persian mathematician. He flourished probably around 982 AD in Isfahan.

He gave a better Arabic edition of the Conics of Apollonius and commented on the first books. The Conics had been translated a century before by Hilal al-Himsi (books 1–4) and Thabit ibn Qurra (books 5–7).

See also
 List of Iranian scientists

References

Sources
H. Suter: Die Mathematiker und Astronomen der Araber (98, 1900).

10th-century Iranian mathematicians